Wang Chen (born 14 January 1974) is a retired table tennis player from the United States of America.

Born in Shanghai, China, she moved to the United States in 2000 and currently resides in New York City. There she met her landlord (Jerry Wartski) who began to sponsor her in tournaments.

She competed at the 2008 Summer Olympics, reaching the quarterfinals of the singles competition. She also competed in the team competition, where they reached the play-off round for the bronze medal.

She announced her retirement on 21 August 2008.

References

External links
Wang Chen Table Tennis official site
 
 

1974 births
Living people
American female table tennis players
Olympic table tennis players of the United States
Table tennis players from Shanghai
Table tennis players at the 2007 Pan American Games
Table tennis players at the 2008 Summer Olympics
American sportspeople of Chinese descent
Chinese emigrants to the United States
Chinese female table tennis players
Pan American Games medalists in table tennis
Pan American Games gold medalists for the United States
Pan American Games bronze medalists for the United States
Naturalised table tennis players
Medalists at the 2007 Pan American Games
21st-century American women